Colostygia olivata, the beech-green carpet, is a moth of the family Geometridae. It was first described by Michael Denis and Ignaz Schiffermüller in 1775 and it is found in most of the Palearctic.

Freshly hatched moths have green forewings. There is a darker, brown central band narrower towards the centre of the forewings. This band is edged with a white wavy line. The hindwings are smoky grey with a pale crossline. The larva is stout, slightly tapering
at each end, rugose, with conspicuous tubercles and setae. It is reddish-ochreous or brownish ochreous with an interrupted grey dorsal line. The lateral and ventral surfaces are mostly dull reddish; tubercles black. The pupa is rather stout, bright red or red-brown, the abdomen darker.

Adults are in wing from May to August in one generation.

The larvae feed on Galium species. Larvae can be found from September to May.

Subspecies
Colostygia olivata olivata
Colostygia olivata gigantea Pinker, 1953

References

External links

Beech-green carpet at UKMoths
Lepidoptera of Belgium
Lepiforum e.V.

Cidariini
Moths of Asia
Moths of Europe
Taxa named by Michael Denis
Taxa named by Ignaz Schiffermüller